ShopHQ (formerly ValueVision, ShopNBC, Evine Live, and Evine) is an American cable, satellite and broadcast home shopping television network and multi-channel video retailer owned by iMedia Brands Inc., in which Comcast holds a 12.5% stake in the company; the company itself is controlled by The Clinton Group. Both ShopHQ and iMedia Brands are headquartered in Eden Prairie, Minnesota. The network's main competitors are Qurate's HSN and QVC, along with Jewelry Television. The channel was launched on March 12, 1991, as ValueVision.

In addition to ShopHQ, iMedia operates two other brands; ShopHQ Health, offering health and wellness products, and the Bulldog Shopping Network, which carries products for men.

History

ValueVision
ValueVision Media was founded in June 1990. On March 12, 1991, the company launched a home shopping channel known as ValueVision.

ShopNBC/HQ
In 2000, NBC purchased a share of the company. In November of that year, ValueVision was rebranded as ShopNBC, and with the rebranding came a new logo for the channel that features the NBC peacock. The parent company retained the ValueVision name.

Reports surfaced in 2010 stating NBC would sell its stake in ValueVision Media, due in part to NBC Universal's pending merger with Comcast. NBCUniversal formally announced that it would sell its stake back to ValueVision Media in May 2010, but ultimately decided in June 2010 to retain its stake in the company.

ValueVision Media acquired NBCUniversal's financial stake in the channel in 2013, and announced the network would be renamed ShopHQ (visually branded as SHQP). Mark Cuban's American Dream aired on the network in 2014, and was part of a plan under the Clinton Group management to feature more celebrity hosts.

Evine
On February 13, 2015, the ShopHQ network was rebranded as EVINE Live, following ValueVision Media's acquisition of e-commerce company Dollars Per Minute, the owner of the EVINE trademark, in order to distance itself from the reputation it held under ValueVision/ShopNBC/ShopHQ. The network hired former QVC host Kathy Levine, and has featured merchandise branded under different reality TV stars, including Lisa Vanderpump and Countess Luann DeLesseps. The company has also premiered concepts from other well-known celebrities, including Paula Deen, Vanessa Williams, Nancy O’Dell, Holly Robinson Peete, Karen Fairchild, Dr. Terry Dubrow and Heather Dubrow, Todd English, Donny Osmond and Bob Vila. It also sells products on its e-commerce website, Evine.com.

EVINE Live launched a high definition feed of the channel in 1080i (including the acquisition of HD tier channel slots under new carriage agreements) the same year, but until September 2017, remained in standard definition, merely rebroadcasting the SD feed. The network converted to an upscaled standard definition widescreen presentation in the fall of 2016, and quietly upgraded to HD a year after.

In July 2016, EVINE dropped 'Live' from their on-air name.

Return to ShopHQ
On July 17, 2019, Evine Live Inc. began doing business under the new corporate banner of iMedia Brands Inc, with their shares traded under a new ticker of IMBI; Invicta Watch Group (which has a number of hours on the network as its largest vendor) invested an additional $6 million into the company. The television network returned to the ShopHQ name effective August 21, which the company used between 2013 and 2015, with the cited reason being market research suggesting confusion with the "E" name being confused for an entertainment news brand such as E! or Entertainment Tonight. The company announced plans to launch a Spanish-speaking shopping channel called LaVenta Shopping Network, along with the male-focused Bulldog Shopping Network, itself a rebranding of evine TOO, a timeshift channel with only minimum cable distribution.

Though the channel slot for Bulldog Shopping Network was activated in the spring of 2020, its focused was quickly changed due to the COVID-19 pandemic. A new concept around health and wellness products (including surgical masks, both disposable and cloth) called ShopHQ Health was launched within weeks of the pandemic and soon became the network space's main concept, and became its new official branding on September 1. Bulldog again launched anew in June 2021, but was discontinued on most providers at the end of December the same year after the network's satellite lease with Olympusat expired and was replaced with Kenneth Copeland's Victory Channel. Some of ShopHQ Health's cable carriage was wound down at the end of May 2022 after its Olympusat satellite lease expired and was replaced by QVC to carry QVC3; both properties continue streaming online, C-Band and over the air.

Former logos

Affiliates
 KSCI 18.1 Long Beach/Los Angeles, California; owned by WRNN-TV Associates 
 KCNS 38.1 San Francisco/Oakland/San Jose, California; owned by WRNN-TV Associates 
 KUBE 57.1 Baytown/Houston, Texas; owned by WRNN-TV Associates 
 KFWD 52.1 Fort-Worth/Dallas, Texas; owned by WRNN-TV Associates
 WWDP 46.1 Boston, Massachusetts; owned by WRNN-TV Associates
 WWCI-CD 10.2 Vero Beach/West Palm Beach, Florida; owned by HC2 Broadcasting
 KZMM-CD 22.2 Fresno, California, owned by Caballero Acquisition, LLC
 WRNN-TV 48.1 New Rochelle, New York, owned by WRNN-TV Associates
 WRTN-LP 6.6 Alexandria/Nashville, Tennessee; owned by Richard C. and Lisa A. Goetz
 WWLM-CD 20.3 Washington/Pittsburgh, Pennsylvania; owned by HC2 Broadcasting
 WMCN-TV 44.1 Princeton, New Jersey; owned by WRNN-TV Associates
 WMDE 36.2 Dover, Delaware; owned by WRNN-TV Associates
 KSKJ-CD 45.5 Van Nuys, California; owned by HC2 Broadcasting
 K21OM-D 20.4 Lafayette, Louisiana; owned by HC2 Broadcasting
 W23BW-D 23.3 Madison, Wisconsin; owned by HC2 Broadcasting
 KOHC-CD 45.3 Oklahoma City, Oklahoma; owned by HC2 Broadcasting
 KHDF-CD 19.6 Las Vegas, Nevada; owned by HC2 Broadcasting
 WRCZ-LD 35.2 Ocala, Florida; owned by HC2 Broadcasting
 WUVM-LD 4.5 Atlanta, Georgia; owned by HC2 Broadcasting
 WPSJ-CD 8.5 Philadelphia, Pennsylvania; owned by HC2 Broadcasting
 WESV-LD 25.4 Chicago, Illinois; owned by Estrella Media
 WOST 14.1 Mayagüez, Puerto Rico; owned by HC2 Broadcasting
 W20EJ-D 26.1 San Juan, Puerto Rico; owned by HC2 Broadcasting
 W27DZ-D 14.1 Mayagüez, Puerto Rico; owned by HC2 Broadcasting
 WWKQ-LD 14.1 Quebradillas, Puerto Rico; owned by HC2 Broadcasting
 WQQZ-CD 14.1 Ponce, Puerto Rico; owned by HC2 Broadcasting
 WDWO-CD 18.3 Detroit, Michigan; owned by HC2 Broadcasting
 WVTT-CD 34.1 Olean/Buffalo, New York; owned by HC2 Broadcasting
 KBKI-LD 27.1 Boise, Idaho; owned by HC2 Broadcasting
 KLKW-LD 22.6 Amarillo, Texas; owned by HC2 Broadcasting
 KAXW-LD 35.4 Mullin/Waco, Texas; owned by HC2 Broadcasting
 WTNO-CD 22.2 New Orleans, Louisiana; owned by HC2 Broadcasting
 K17JI-D 12.2 Fresno, California; owned by HC2 Broadcasting
 KVDF-CD 31.3 San Antonio, Texas; owned by HC2 Broadcasting
 KQDF-LD 25.2 Santa Fe, New Mexico; owned by HC2 Broadcasting
 KLDF-CD 17.2 Lompoc/San Luis Obispo, California; owned by HC2 Broadcasting
 KAHC-LD 43.1 Sacramento, California; owned by HC2 Broadcasting
 K34HO-D 34.3 Willmar, Minnesota; owned by UHF TV
 WHDO-CD owned by Western Pacific Broadcast
 K33LN-D 33.5 Minneapolis, Minnesota; owned by HC2 Broadcasting
 WXAX-CD 26.2 Clearwater/Tampa, Florida; owned by HC2 Broadcasting
 W15EB-D 21.1 Charlotte, North Carolina; owned by HC2 Broadcasting
 WQAW-LD 69.4 Lake Shore/Baltimore, Maryland; owned by HC2 Broadcasting
 WIRP-LD 27.1 Raleigh, North Carolina; owned by HC2 Broadcasting

References

External links

iMedia Brands, Inc., corporate website

English-language television stations in the United States
Television channels and stations established in 1991
Shopping networks in the United States
1991 establishments in Minnesota
Companies based in Eden Prairie, Minnesota